The Mulladay Hollow Bridge is a stone arch bridge in rural Carroll County, Arkansas. It carries County Road 204 across Mulladay Hollow Creek, near the southwestern tip of Lake Leatherwood  It has two spans, and is built out of roughly square and semi-coursed fieldstone. The barrels of the arches are skewed with respect to the spandrels, and the wing walls are slightly curved. The bridge was built with Works Progress Administration funding as part of the development of Lake Leatherwood as a recreation area.

The bridge was listed on the National Register of Historic Places in 1990.

See also
List of bridges documented by the Historic American Engineering Record in Arkansas
List of bridges on the National Register of Historic Places in Arkansas
National Register of Historic Places listings in Carroll County, Arkansas

References

External links

Road bridges on the National Register of Historic Places in Arkansas
Historic American Engineering Record in Arkansas
National Register of Historic Places in Carroll County, Arkansas
Stone arch bridges in the United States
Transportation in Carroll County, Arkansas
Works Progress Administration in Arkansas